ANH may refer to:

 ANH, ICAO airline code for Alajnihah Airways
 Atrial natriuretic hormone or atrial natriuretic peptide
 Alliance for Natural Health, UK
A New Hope, the first released Star Wars film

See also

Anh. (disambiguation)
Anth (disambiguation)